The Frankfort and Cincinnati Model 55 Rail Car (also known as "The Cardinal" and, colloquially to residents along it route, as The Dinky) is a historic railcar on the National Register of Historic Places. The railcar currently resides at the Kentucky Railway Museum in New Haven, Nelson County, Kentucky.

It was built in 1927 by the Brill Company of Philadelphia, Pennsylvania. Weighing only , it was cheap to use, costing only 16 cents a mile. Due to always being painted red, it was called "The Cardinal", in tribute to the state bird.

On December 31, 1952, when the F&C stopped passenger service, The Cardinal was retired; passenger trains could not compete with automobiles. The Cardinal broke an axle on Christmas Eve eight days before, and for the last week of passenger service the F&C Superintendent A.E. Parker used his own sedan to transport what few passengers the F&C still had from Frankfort to Paris.

The Kentucky Railway Museum gained possession of The Cardinal in 1960.  In 1997 it was one of a maximum of six known gas-powered motor rail cars left in the United States, and the only one in the Southeastern United States.

The Frankfort and Cincinnati Model 55 Rail Car is one of four train vehicles at the Kentucky Railway Museum on the National Register.  The others are the Louisville and Nashville Steam Locomotive No. 152, the Louisville and Nashville Combine Car Number 665, and the Mt. Broderick Pullman Car.

The F&C had two Brill Railcars: M55-1 and #2.  It was #2 that broke the axle while crossing the Southern Ry at Georgetown, Ky.

References

National Register of Historic Places in New Haven, Kentucky
Railway vehicles on the National Register of Historic Places in Kentucky
Petrol railcars
Railcars of the United States
Vehicles introduced in 1927
Transportation in Nelson County, Kentucky
J. G. Brill Company